The Rock Valley College Studio Theatre was an indoor community theater located on the Rock Valley College campus in Rockford, Illinois; its operational status has been put on hold indefinitely, a casualty of the Illinois Budget crisis (see: Bruce Rauner#Governor of Illinois). It is often conflated with the Rock Valley College Starlight Theatre, which operates in the nearby Bengt Sjostrom Theatre, an award-winning outdoor complex known as Starlight Theatre by local residents. Confusion exists as both theatres are operated by the RVC Theatre Department and stand in close proximity to one another.

Theatre History 

The 172-seat, three-quarter thrust theatre is housed in a converted barn, along with the RVC Theatre Department offices and costume storage facilities. The building and its accompanying 217 acres were purchased by the college in 1965 from Dr. J.J. Rogers. The structure has undergone several renovations and served multiple purposes since its initial purchase, at certain times housing the college cafeteria, library and admissions offices. As the campus grew, new buildings were assigned to serve these purposes. By 1985, an unnamed student theatre group had taken up residence in the building. This group would eventually be folded into the existing RVC Theatre Department. Plans to move from "the barn" to a new Arts Instructional Center with modern amenities has been tabled by the college's board of Trustees.

Production History 

According to local newspaper records, more than 130 productions have taken place in Studio Theatre.
 1985: Ah! Wilderness
 1985: Christmas with the Conroys
 1986: Ladyhouse Blues
 1986: Wings
 1986: End of the World
 1986: Christmas with the Conroys
 1987: Same Time Next Year
 1987: Woulda, Coulda, Shoulda
 1987: Prometheus Bound
 1987: Hoosier Lore
 1988: Two Gentlemen of Verona
 1988: Dr. Franken's Consuming Obsession
 1988: Death of a 2nd Husband
 1988: Christmas with the Conroys
 1989: The Tempest
 1989: Smile of the Buddha
 1989: Your Plays or Mine
 1989: Christmas at Wits End
 1990: Measure for Measure
 1990: Danger:Memory
 1990: King Lear
 1990: Godspell
 1991: Midsummer Nights Dream
 1991: Verdict
 1991: Richard III
 1991: Fantasticks
 1992: Wild Oats
 1992: Runner Stumbles
 1992: Macbeth
 1992: Cotton Patch Gospel
 1993: Rosencrantz & Guildenstern are Dead
 1993: Ten Little Indians
 1993: Henry IV I
 1993: She Loves Me
 1994: Lend Me a Tenor
 1994: Witness for the Prosecution 
 1994: Romeo & Juliet
 1994: American Rock
 1995: Kites Book
 1995: The Hollow
 1995: Hamlet
 1995: 1940's Radio Hour
 1996: Bad Manners
 1996: Black Coffee
 1996: Winter's Tale
 1996: They're Playing Our Song
 1997: Star Rover
 1997: Towards Zero
 1997: Much Ado About Nothing
 1997: Nunsense
 1998: Three Women Embracing
 1998: Spider's Web
 1998: Twelfth Night
 1998: Dames at Sea
 1999: Royal Hunt of the Sun
 1999: The Mousetrap
 1999: Julius Caesar
 1999: Company
 2000: Confused in Blimey
 2000: Unexpected Guest
 2000: As You Like It
 2000: King Henry V
 2000: Midsummer Nights Dream
 2000: Titus Andronicus
 2000: Nunsense
 2001: The Lake
 2001: Murder at the Vicarage
 2001: Comedy of Errors
 2001: Macbeth
 2001: Richard II
 2001: The Christmas Schooner
 2002: Crossing Bridges
 2002: Murder on the Nile
 2002: Henry IV, Part II
 2002: Taming of the Shrew
 2002: Troilus & Cressida
 2002: Cabaret
 2003: Emily's Shadow
 2003: Cards on the Table
 2003: Othello
 2003: Loves Labours Lost
 2003: Into the Woods
 2004: Pearl's Jam
 2004: Alibi
 2004: Merchant of Venice
 2004: Timon of Athens
 2004: Queen Margaret
 2004: Victor/Victoria
 2005: Scapino!
 2005: Love From a Stranger
 2005: Romeo & Juliet (also performed at the Bengt Sjostrom Theatre)
 2005: The Christmas Schooner
 2006: The Mayor of West Belvidere
 2006: Appointment with Death
 2006: Antony & Cleopatra
 2006: All's Well that Ends Well
 2006: Lent
 2007: You Can't Take it With You
 2007: A Murder is Announced
 2007: Merry Wives of Windsor
 2007: Pericles
 2007: Faculty Lounge
 2008: Last Easter
 2008: A Daughter's A Daughter
 2008: King John
 2008: Cymbeline
 2008: Caroline or Change
 2009: American Buffalo
 2009: Peril at End House
 2009: Hamlet
 2009: Coriolanus
 2009: Christmas with the Conroys
 2010: Cotton Patch Gospel
 2010: And Then There Were None
 2010: The Tempest
 2010: King Henry VIII
 2010: Hoosier Lore
 2011: Grey Gardens
 2011: Go Back for Murder
 2011: King Lear
 2011: A Christmas Carol
 2012: Rocky Horror Show
 2012: Murder is Easy
 2012: A Midsummer Night's Dream
 2012: Rocky Horror Show (Reprise)
 2013: Avenue Q
 2013: Fiddler's Three
 2013: Joseph and the Amazing Technicolor Dreamcoat
 2013: The Wizard of Oz

Original Works Program 

Since before its official formation, Studio Theatre has performed original plays by local playwrights.
 The Northwest Suburban Penny Ante Poker Club & Suicide League by T. Zack, 1983
 Lazaretti or the Saber-Toothed Tiger by F. Hockwalder, 1984–85
 Christmas with the Conroys by T. Zack, 1985–86
 Woulda, Coulda, Shoulda by M. Swan, 1986–87
 Aeschylus' Prometheus Bound (translated by the cast), 1987–88
 Hoosier Lore by T. Zack, 1987–88
 Dr. Franken's Consuming Obsession by G. Freek, 1987–88
 Death of a Second Husband by R. Cline, 1988–89
 The Smile of the Buddha by G. Freek, 1988–89
 Your Plays or Mine by B. Wine, 1989–90
 Christmas at Wits End by T. Zack, 1989–90
 American Rock by J.E. Murray & R. Pauly, 1994–95
 Kite's Book by R. Caisley, 1994–95
 Bad Manners by R. Caisley, 1994–95
 The Star Rover by M.P. Webb, 1996–97
 Three Women Embracing by R. Caisley, 1997–98
 Confused in Blimey by T. Hunter, 1999–2000
 World Premiere of The Lake by R. Caisley, 2000–01
 Crossing Bridges by C. Blatcher-Martin, 2001–02
 Emily's Shadow by G. Quirk, 2002–03
 Pearl's Jam by Tom Hunter, 2003–04
 Shakespeare's Queen Margaret (adapted by R. Potter - Midwest Premiere), 2004–05
 The Mayor of West Belvidere by T. Hunter, 2005–06

References 

Buildings and structures in Rockford, Illinois
Theatres in Illinois
University and college theatres in the United States
Tourist attractions in Rockford, Illinois
Rock Valley College